Babcary Meadows is a  biological Site of Special Scientific Interest north of Babcary in Somerset, notified in 1988.

Babcary Meadows is one of the last remaining areas of traditionally managed unimproved neutral grassland in south Somerset and contains a rich variety of herbs.

The plant community contains a very high proportion of herbaceous species. Areas immediately adjacent to the river bank are frequently waterlogged and contain numerous tussocks of Soft rush (Juncus effusus). Associated plants include Meadowsweet (Filipendula ulmaria), Cuckoo flower (Cardamine pratensis) and Common fleabane (Pulicaria dysenterica).

Over two hundred species of flora have been recorded on the  Somerset Wildlife Trust reserve, fourteen of which are classified 'notable species' in Somerset, and six of which are orchids. Badgers (Meles meles) and Roe deer (Capreolus capreolus) frequent the reserve and it is probable that Otters (Lutra lutra) use the river corridor. The site was purchased by the trust following grant assistance from South Somerset Council.

References

External links 

Sites of Special Scientific Interest in Somerset
Sites of Special Scientific Interest notified in 1988
Nature reserves in Somerset
Wetland Sites of Special Scientific Interest
Meadows in Somerset